Ushuaia – Malvinas Argentinas International Airport is located  south of the center of Ushuaia, a city on the island of Tierra del Fuego in the Tierra del Fuego Province of Argentina.

Overview

The airport was opened in 1995, replacing an older one, which is now in use with the Ushuaia Aeroclub . The new airport has been used by various airlines at different periods. It is the world's southernmost international airport and is often used by passengers as a cruise-ship gateway to the Antarctic. 

Ushuaia International Airport can accommodate airplanes as large as the Boeing 747. Tower Air operated 747s into the airport, and Aerolíneas Argentinas operated 747-400s into the airport during events of high passenger numbers (such as entire cruise-ship passenger payloads) until retiring the 747 in February 2012. Two chartered Air France Concordes also visited in the past: F-BTSD arriving from Buenos Aires and continuing to Santiago, Chile, in early 1999; the second arriving from Easter Island, Chile and continuing to Buenos Aires prior to the cessation of most Concorde charter flights on 25 July 2000 (following the crash of Air France 4590). In the past, Condor, LTU, Air Berlin and Lufthansa also offered charter flights from Germany, Austrian Airlines from Austria, and XL Airways UK and First Choice Airways from the United Kingdom. It also chartered flights to Maputo, Mozambique.

The airport's name reflects Argentina's claims of sovereignty over the British Overseas Territory of the Falkland Islands.

The airport is on a peninsula extending south into the Beagle Channel, and all approach and departures are over the water.

Airlines and destinations

Statistics

Gallery

See also

Transport in Argentina
List of airports in Argentina

References

External links

 Official website
 London Supply Group
 
 

Ushuaia
Airports in Argentina
Carlos Ott buildings
Buildings and structures in Tierra del Fuego Province, Argentina